With five different modes of transport the San Francisco Municipal Railway runs one of the most diverse fleets of vehicles in the United States. Roughly 550 diesel-electric hybrid buses, 300 electric trolleybuses, 250 modern light rail vehicles, 50 historic streetcars and 40 cable cars see active duty.

Muni's cable cars are the oldest and largest such system remaining in service in the world and its fleet of electric trolleybuses is the largest in the United States. In 2020, Muni completed the process of replacing its motor coach fleet – the first of which was procured in 1915 – with diesel-electric hybrid buses.

Fleet overview 
This chart is a summary of the vehicles currently operated by Muni. All buses are accessible at all stops. All streetcars are accessible; however, some surface stops on the E and F lines, and many Muni Metro surface stops, are not accessible. Cable cars are not accessible.

Facilities

Bus fleet 
, Muni operates a fleet of roughly 550 diesel-electric hybrid buses and 300 electric trolleybuses, consisting nearly entirely of New Flyer Xcelsior coaches which have a high degree of parts commonality. The only non-Xcelsior coaches are the battery-electric test buses and the  "community route" buses which were built by ENC as New Flyer does not offer a short Xcelsior coach.

Diesel-electric hybrid buses 
Muni's active diesel fleet contains coaches ranging from thirty to sixty feet in length. All of Muni's current buses are diesel-electric hybrid buses, fueled with renewable diesel fuel made from bio-feedstock sources, including fats, oils and greases. The diesel-electric hybrid technology has proven very capable of climbing San Francisco's steep hills.

Before 2007, Muni had an all-Diesel fleet that had been purchased from three manufacturers, NABI, Neoplan and Orion, all of whom no longer sell buses in the U.S. (NABI merged into New Flyer, Neoplan left the North American market, and Daimler shutdown Orion), making repairs challenging. After purchasing its first hybrid buses in 2007, the agency embarked on a nearly 15 year project to replace the entire fleet. The new fleet has averaged more miles between road calls – in which a mechanic services a transit vehicle on the street – than the prior diesel coaches.

Electric trolleybuses 

Muni's fleet of electric trolleybuses (ETBs) is the largest in the nation and serves many parts of the city. ETBs were very popular in the United States in the middle of the 20th century. Today, San Francisco is one of only five cities in the United States with an operational ETB fleet,  but they play a major role in the Muni system, in part because of the city's many steep hills. Although their overhead wires are sometimes considered unsightly, ETBs are able to climb grades much steeper than conventional, non-cable streetcars and are quieter (particularly when climbing hills) and cleaner than diesel- or hybrid buses. The steepest grade on the Muni trolleybus system, 22.8% in the block of Noe Street between Cesar Chavez Street and 26th Street on route 24-Divisadero, is the steepest grade on any existing trolleybus line in the world, and several other sections of Muni ETB routes are among the world's steepest.  Muni has operated trolleybuses since 1941 and the mode has been present in San Francisco since 1935—initially a line built and operated by the Market Street Railway and later taken over by Muni. Conversion of some existing diesel bus lines has been proposed.

In 1992, Muni tested its first 60-ft articulated trolleybus, the New Flyer E60, which was the first in the trolleybus fleet to have a wheelchair lift. The E60s were used on high-ridership trolleybus routes and started service in 1993.

Muni's active ETB fleet consists of articulated coaches from New Flyer (XT60), as well as standard 40 ft coaches from New Flyer (XT40). Historically, Muni ran ETBs from Brill, the St. Louis Car Company, Twin Coach, Marmon-Herrington, Flyer (E800 and E60) and Electric Transit, Inc. (ETI) (Skoda/AAI 14TrSF and 15TrSF).

Battery-electric test buses 

In 2018, the SFMTA Board voted to purchase all-electric buses exclusively beginning in 2025, with the last non-electric buses retired by 2035. Muni previously had not bought battery-electric buses (BEBs) because they were not proven on steep hills and on high-ridership routes. In November 2019, Muni executed contracts with New Flyer (for $4.5 million), BYD Auto ($3.5 million), and Proterra ($5.3 million) to procure three BEBs from each vendor as a pilot program to evaluate their performance and test future bus features. Each contract has an option for up to three more BEBs. A fourth contract with Nova Bus ($4.8 million), the only major bus manufacturer excluded from the first round of contracts, was issued in April 2021. The buses in the pilot program will be charged at Woods using newly-installed chargers. Under the pilot program plan, the buses will operate on the 9 San Bruno, 22 Fillmore, 29 Sunset, and 44 O'Shaughnessy routes. The first battery-electric bus entered service in February 2022.

Under the Zero-Emission Bus Rollout Plan published in February 2021, 54 articulated buses will be the first production BEBs for Muni and that first purchase is planned for 2027. The last diesel-electric hybrid buses will leave service by 2037. By 2040, the Muni bus fleet is anticipated to be composed entirely of BEBs: 30 (30-foot) + 497 (40-foot) + 462 (60-foot) for 989 buses in total. No on-route charging is planned; BEBs will use depot chargers at six of Muni's yards. Eventually, it is planned to upgrade these yards with SAE J3105 (inverted pantograph) chargers over several years: Kirkland (77 chargers, 2024–27), Potrero (206 chargers, 2024–27), Flynn (109 chargers, 2025–28), Presidio (217 chargers, 2028–31), Islais Creek (149 chargers, 2030–33), and Woods (177 chargers, 2034–37).

The ZEB Rollout Plan was updated in July 2022. Under the revised ZEB Rollout Plan, the existing fleet of trolleybuses would be replaced one-for-one starting in 2031; the existing fleet of hybrid diesel-electric buses would be gradually replaced starting in 2026 with battery-electric buses until the planned retirement of the last diesel hybrids in 2037. In 2038, it is anticipated the mix of buses will be entirely BEBs (30× 32-foot, 403× 40-foot, and 297× 60-foot articulated) and trolleybuses (185× 40-foot and 93× 60-foot artic). The yard upgrades were re-sequenced and accelerated: Kirkland (91 chargers, 2022–25), Potrero (216, 2024–27), Islais Creek (117, 2024–30), Presidio (227, 2027–31), Flynn (107, 2029–34), and Woods (250, 2030–35). The total cost of the project is $1.8 billion, divided between new buses ($1.4 B) and charging infrastructure ($0.4 B), excluding the cost of labor and other potential infrastructure upgrades.

Cable car fleet 

Around the turn of the twentieth century, there were numerous cable car lines providing service to many sections of the city. Some of those cable cars are built by Muni themselves.  Currently only three lines and forty cars remain.

Light rail vehicle fleet

Contemporary light rail vehicles 

The Muni Metro has run multiple types of light rail vehicles. Originally, 131 Boeing-Vertol cars, which Muni designated LRV1, were used. However, these proved to be extremely troublesome and were phased out of service beginning in 1997. The Boeing cars were replaced by 151 Italian-built Breda LRV2 and LRV3 models. Initially, the Breda vehicles were hailed as more reliable and easier to service than their predecessors. However, deferred maintenance and design defects have taken their toll on them.

Muni has expanded its fleet with new Siemens light rail vehicles; the 151 Bredas will be replaced one-for-one starting in 2021. The first phase of 68 Siemens S200 LRV4s (for fleet expansion: 24 Central Subway + 40 Option 1 + 4 Phase W) were delivered between 2017 and 2019, ahead of the scheduled opening of the Central Subway. SFMTA's initial contract with Siemens called for a maximum of 260 cars to be delivered: 175 in the base order (151 of which are to replace the Bredas, and 24 for fleet expansion to accommodate anticipated ridership via the Central Subway), 40 as Option 1, and 45 as Option 2. Four more Siemens LRV4s were ordered in June 2017 for Phase W, which anticipates expanded service to Chase Center, using the Mission Bay Transportation Improvement Fund. Option 1 (+40) was exercised in 2015 and Option 2 was partially exercised (+30) in 2021 so there are firm orders for 249 LRV4s.

The first LRV4 went into revenue service on November 17, 2017.

Inactive/retired light rail vehicles 

The US Standard Light Rail Vehicle was an attempt at a standardized light rail vehicle (LRV) promoted by the United States Urban Mass Transit Administration (UMTA) and built by Boeing Vertol in the 1970s. Part of a series of defense conversion projects in the waning days of the Vietnam War, the LRV was seen as both a replacement for older PCC streetcars in many cities and as a catalyst for new cities to construct light rail systems. The USSLRV was marketed as the Boeing LRV and is usually referred to as such. The USSLRV was purchased by both Muni and the MBTA (Boston), but no other public transportation system in the United States purchased USSLRVs. Under the settlement terms of a lawsuit between Boeing Vertol and MBTA, MBTA was granted the right to reject the last 40 cars. The completed MBTA cars sat in storage until Muni purchased 31 of them.

After the last LRV1 was retired in 2001, Muni stored two cars (1264 and 1320) at the Cameron Beach Yard (formerly the Geneva Streetcar Yard) for potential restoration and preservation by the Market Street Railway, but they declined to do so and both were scrapped in April 2016. Two LRV1s are preserved in museums:
 1213 (since 2000), at the Oregon Electric Railway Museum
 1258, at the Western Railway Museum
In addition, No. 1271 is used as an office trailer in a Bay Area scrapyard.

The succeeding Breda LRV2/LRV3 fleet of 151 cars is scheduled to phase into retirement between 2021, when the oldest cars are 25 years old, and completely retire by 2027. 25 years is considered the useful lifespan of light rail vehicles, per the FTA and Muni. Since delivery of the Siemens LRV4 fleet has been ahead of schedule, Muni is considering an earlier retirement for some of the oldest Breda cars.

Historic streetcar fleet 
Historic streetcars are run on the F Market & Wharves and E Embarcadero lines. Introduced as a regular, year-round service in 1995, the F-line heritage streetcar service started out 12 years earlier as a temporary, replacement tourist attraction for the cable carsknown as the San Francisco Historic Trolley Festivalduring an almost two-year suspension (1982–84) of all cable-car service to permit major infrastructure rebuilding to take place.

The historic streetcar fleet is composed mostly of PCC cars as well as 1920s-vintage Peter Witt cars from Milan. In addition, Muni operates streetcars from around the world which were bought or donated to the transit agency.

The vintage fleet is looked over by the nonprofit Market Street Railway organization, but the vehicles are owned and operated by Muni.

PCC fleet 
Muni's PCC streetcars are divided into one of five classes, sorted by fleet number and original service:

Big Ten/Baby Ten/1000s

First batch 
Before 1995, several PCCs were rehabilitated by Morrison–Knudsen (MK) before entering revenue service. These include three of the double-ended "Torpedo" cars or "Big Tens" (1007, 1010, and 1015), which were originally built for Muni; and the single-ended 1050-class (1050–1064), which were originally built for Philadelphia Transportation Company (PTC), the predecessor to today's SEPTA. Both of these sub-classes were built originally in the late 1940s.

Car 1054 (original 2121) was damaged beyond repair following an accident on November 16, 2003 and it was stored awaiting scrapping. In 2014, Muni sent 1056, the first from the original batch of sixteen to be overhauled at Brookville Equipment Corporation. The entire first batch of sixteen is scheduled to be rebuilt at Brookville; the next cars to be sent were 1051, 1060, and 1059 in that order; followed (in indeterminate order) by 1055, 1062, and 1063. The first streetcar to re-enter service, 1051, was re-dedicated to Harvey Milk in March 2017, and was followed back into service by 1056.

Second batch 
The cars that are presently numbered 1070–1080 were purchased originally by Twin Cities Rapid Transit in 1946. They were sold to Newark in 1953 and ran on the Newark City Subway until replacement by modern light rail vehicles in 2001. The San Francisco Municipal Railway acquired these cars in 2004 and had the cars overhauled at Brookville Equipment Corporation. Some of the cars were put in service in early 2007, but were taken out of service for wiring problems. These problems were eventually repaired. All these cars are single-end cars.

Third batch 
A third group of PCC cars originally built for Muni in 1948 and 1952 were restored at Brookville in 2010–2011 and subsequently returned to service. This batch includes four double-ended "Big Ten" cars (1006, 1008, 1009, 1011) and the sole restored "Baby Ten" (1040), the last PCC car ever built in North America.

Remaining PCC cars 
The remainder of the PCC streetcars assigned numbers 10xx which have yet to be restored mostly were acquired by Muni before 1952. This includes cars from three distinct sub-classes: the double-ended "Big Ten" (1014; the "Big 10s" comprise 1006–1015), the single-ended "Baby Tens" (1016–1040), and the "1050s". Of the 1050s, which were acquired from SEPTA in the early 1990s, most were restored and are in service, but two were scrapped: 1054 (ex-SEPTA 2121), which was damaged beyond repair in 2003 after re-entering revenue service, and 1064 (ex-SEPTA 2133), which was never rehabilitated after acquisition.

Gunnar Henrioulle acquired several retired "Baby Ten" and "11xx" class cars as the largest single purchaser of retired Muni cars in the mid-1990s. He also acquired an ex-San Diego PCC (#502), two ex-Toronto PCCs (#4404 and #4472), and built a double-ended PCC from ex-Baby Ten #1024 and #1035. Henrioulle had intended to use the PCCs for a heritage streetcar line called Tahoe Valley Lines, but the government of South Lake Tahoe, California did not approve his plans and he was forced to sell off most of his fleet in 2001; four of his Baby Tens (#1026, 1027, 1038, and 1034) were reacquired by Muni at this time.

11xx class 
The 1100s series of cars were purchased in 1957 by Muni from St. Louis Public Service. These cars were retired in 1982 with the inauguration of Muni Metro LRV/subway service, with most being sold off to Henrioulle for Tahoe Valley Lines. In 2005–06, three of the 11xx class were purchased for the Silver Line heritage trolley service of the San Diego Trolley: #1122 (ex-St. Louis #1716), #1123 (ex-St. Louis #1728), and #1170 (ex-St. Louis #1777). These were renumbered to #529, 530, and 531, respectively, for the San Diego service and #529 was restored by early 2011. Under pressure, Henrioulle would sell nine PCCs (including six of the 11xx class: #1113, 1127, 1139, 1145, 1148, and 1169) to a developer in St. Charles, Missouri in 2007 for the planned St. Charles City Streetcar. The developer went bankrupt in 2009 and the streetcars were stored; after a fire in 2012, the St. Charles streetcars were scrapped.

Milan "Peter Witt" trams 
These Peter Witt streetcars were originally in service in Milan, Italy. Original Italian signage was kept in place, supplemented with English signs.

Historic trams

San Francisco 
The following shows trams that operated in San Francisco before the 1950s under either San Francisco Muni or Market Street Railway.

"Wheels of the world" trams 
A diverse collection of authentic vintage trolleys, trams, and streetcars from cities other than San Francisco.

Historical bus fleet 
The following shows the buses previously operated by the SFMTA. Some of these coaches have been preserved in the historic fleet, donated to trolley museums, or auctioned.

See also 
 Bay Area Rapid Transit rolling stock
 Peter Witt streetcar
 US Standard Light Rail Vehicle
 Muni Metro
 Perley A. Thomas
 Jewett Car Company
 W.L. Holman Car Company

References

External links 
 
 
 
 
 CPTDB wiki about San Francisco Municipal Railway fleet not 100% accurate enough

Heritage streetcar systems
Light rail in California
San Francisco Municipal Railway
Articles containing video clips